The Port of Vaasa (Finnish: Vaasan satama, Swedish: Vasa hamn) is a mixed-use port in the city of Vaasa on the west coast of Finland, in the Kvarken area of the Gulf of Bothnia. It is situated on the island of Vaskiluoto, some  due west of the Vaasa city centre, and connected to the mainland by the Vaskiluoto road and rail bridge. The port is serviced by the tracks and infrastructure of Vaskiluoto railway station.

In 2018, inbound (import) cargo traffic accounted for  80% of the port's total throughput, with the majority of this consisting of coal and oil intended as fuel for the nearby Vaskiluoto power stations.

The port also serves as a terminal for passenger and vehicle ferries to Umeå, Sweden, operated by Wasa Line. In 2018, the port handled over 200,000 passengers.

Since 2015, the ports of Vaasa and Umeå have, despite being in different countries, been operated by the same company, Kvarken Hamnar Ab / Merenkurkun Satamat Oy (literally 'Ports of Kvarken'), jointly owned by the two cities.

Specifications
The port comprises the following infrastructure:
"Rein's quay": length , depth 
"Lasse's quay": length , depth 
Coal quay: length , depth 
Oil terminal quay: depth 
Ferry (passenger) quay: two RO-RO ramps, depth 
Southern pier: length , depth 
Northern pier: two RO-RO ramps, depth 
Two mobile cranes and one bulk cargo loader

References

External links

Vaasa
Vaasa
Companies based in Vaasa
Water transport in Finland